Andrés Gómez was the defending champion, but lost in the second round to Marcelo Filippini.

Emilio Sánchez won the title by defeating Sergi Bruguera 6–4, 7–6(9–7), 6–2 in the final.

Seeds
The first eight seeds received a bye to the second round.

Draw

Finals

Top half

Section 1

Section 2

Bottom half

Section 3

Section 4

References

External links
 Official results archive (ATP)
 Official results archive (ITF)

1991 ATP Tour